Paleomattea is an extinct genus of prawn, containing the single species Paleomattea deliciosa. The species is only known from the stomach contents of the fish Rhacolepis, which is referred to by the specific epithet deliciosa ("delicious"), and in the generic name, where mattea means "delicacy".

References

Dendrobranchiata
Early Cretaceous crustaceans
Monotypic arthropod genera
Fossil taxa described in 1995
Early Cretaceous animals of South America
Albian genera
Cretaceous arthropods of South America
Cretaceous Brazil
Fossils of Brazil